Kyre is a small village and civil parish in the Malvern Hills district of the county of Worcestershire, England, and shares its parish council with neighbouring Stoke Bliss and Bockleton.

Kyre Minor and Kyre Wyard were both in the upper division of Doddingtree Hundred.

Kyre Park 

Kyre Park is a park and gardens within the village which is known for being designed by Capability Brown. The park was used for hunting deer until the mid 1700s, when it was laid out for the Pytts family. It contins numerous follies and a Grade II listed barn, which now houses antiques. The park is privately owned but is open daily to the public.

References

Villages in Worcestershire
Civil parishes in Worcestershire